Friendship is an incorporated town in Jackson County, Oklahoma, United States. As of the 2010 census it had a population of 24.

History 
Before Oklahoma became the 46th state, Friendship was located in Indian Territory, Oklahoma Territory, and Greer County, Texas.

Southwestern Oklahoma was once part of a vast sea of grass stretching as far as the eye could see, populated by millions of buffalo and claimed by Texas, but ruled by the Comanche and Kiowa people. After the last free bands of Comanche and Kiowa were confined to the reservation at Fort Sill in 1875, the area became safe for cattle drives. From 1876 to 1892, millions of longhorns were driven from Texas to Dodge City, Kansas, and Ogallala, Nebraska, over the Great Western Cattle Trail which passed through the middle of what is now Friendship.

In 1880, giant Texas cattle companies, attracted by the rich grazing land, started moving into southwestern Oklahoma. At that time, the area was claimed by Texas as Greer County, based on its assertion that the North Fork of the Red River was the main channel of the Red River. In 1890, the Oklahoma Territory was created, and a lawsuit was filed by the United States to resolve the boundary dispute. In 1896, the U.S. Supreme Court determined that the area was a part of the Oklahoma Territory, not Texas, and it was opened for homesteading in 1897.

Over the years, a number of communities, including Clabber Flat, Alfalfa, Lone Oak, Ricks, Riverside, Pleasant Point and Navajoe, were settled in the Friendship area. Clabber Flat School, which opened in 1899, became the first Friendship School, changing its name to Friendship because of its association with the Friendship Baptist Church, which was organized and often met at the school.

Friendship was originally known as "Alfalfa" and was the site of the Alfalfa Post Office from 1903 to 1905. In 1908, the Friendship Baptist Church was built at Alfalfa, and the town soon became known as "Friendship". In 1920, the Friendship and Navajoe School Districts, and parts of the Lone Oak and Riverside School Districts, consolidated to form a new Friendship Consolidated District. In 1935, Pleasant Point consolidated with Friendship, and in later years, students were gained from the Ozark and Headrick School Districts.

Friendship thrived during the first part of the 20th century. At its peak, the town included two service stations, two grocery stores, two cotton gins, two blacksmith shops, a garage, a hardware store, a barber shop, a cafe, a feed mill, a domino parlor and as many as twenty residences. In addition to the Friendship Baptist Church within the town, the Midway Methodist Church was constructed in 1913, one mile east of the town.

After World War II, improved transportation allowed area residents to take their trade to Altus, and there was a pronounced exodus from the farm to the city. One by one, the businesses in Friendship closed. After the Friendship School burned in 1962, Friendship and Warren schools were consolidated to form a new school district known as Navajo, which built a new school midway between the two towns in 1963. 1982 marked the closing of the Midway Methodist Church.

Today 
 
Incorporated in 1999, Friendship has seen a recent increase in residential construction in its vicinity. However, only the Friendship Baptist Church, a community center (which houses the Friendship Volunteer Fire Department) and a few residences actually exist within the town limits.

Geography
Friendship is in northeastern Jackson County,  by road northeast of the center of Altus, the county seat.

Demographics

References

External links
History of Friendship, Oklahoma
 Encyclopedia of Oklahoma History and Culture - Friendship

Towns in Oklahoma
Towns in Jackson County, Oklahoma